New Jersey increased its apportionment from 5 seats to 6 after the 1800 census.

The Federalists did not run any official candidates in 1802, but a few Federalists did receive scattered votes.

See also 
 United States House of Representatives elections, 1802 and 1803
 List of United States representatives from New Jersey

1803
New Jersey
United States House of Representatives